Galdames is a valley, town and municipality located in the province of Biscay, in the autonomous community of Basque Country, northern Spain.

Main sights are Santa Maria Magdalena and Arenaza caves, both situated in Triano mountain range and the latter containing stalactites and rest of mining operations. Medieval Tower of Loizaga is located in Concejuelo ward, nowadays site of a museum of classic automobiles.

Neighborhoods 
Galdames is administratively divided into 8 neighborhoods or wards:
 Atxuriaga (La Aceña).
 Concejuelo.
 Humaran.
 Larrea.
 Montellano.
 San Esteban Galdames.
 San Pedro Galdames.
 Txabarri.

History 
The town of Galdames was first mentioned in a document dating to 1214. During the Middle Ages, Galdames was the home of various important lords and their families. The towers of the local Loizaga, Atxurriaga and Larrea people bear witness to this.

The Council of Galdames claimed the right to be a member of the Lordship of Biscay, which it received in 1672. In 1740 the council separated from the Lordship of Biscay before rejoining in 1800.

During the First Carlist War, the followers of Baldomero Espartero burned the forests surrounding San Pedro Galdames. From the 19th to mid-20th centuries, the town prospered due to the mineral wealth located beneath the valley.

In 1946, a group of Maquis returned from the Cantabrian mountains to Bizkaia and constructed a sheltered in the cave of Uraiaga and the surrounding mines.

Demography

References 

Municipalities in Biscay